90–93 is a compilation by the Italian band Punkreas, which brings together the first two EPs: Isterico and United Rumors of Punkreas.

Track listing
 No Cops - 2:29
 Isterico - 3:20
 Persia - 2:22
 Anarchia - 1:26
 Antisocialism - 2:37
 Funny - 1:26
 Fegato centenario - 2:04
 Il vicino - 2:11
 Occhi puntati - 3:05
 Disgusto totale - 3:06
 È ora di finirla - 2:16
 Alterazione cerebrale - 2:53
 Montezuma - 3:04
 Intifada - 2:43
 Skizo - 2:47
 Il vicino - 2:44
 I chiromanti (live) - 5:52
 Tutti in pista (live) - 3:39

References

1997 compilation albums
Punkreas albums